Ancistrus minutus is a species of catfish in the family Loricariidae. It is native to South America, where it occurs in tributaries of the Tocantins River upstream of the Serra da Mesa Dam in Goiás, Brazil. The species reaches 5.7 cm (2.2 inches) SL. It is named for its notably small size when compared with many of its congeners.

References 

minutus
Catfish of South America
Fish described in 2001